Birds of Tokyo are an Australian alternative rock band from Perth, Western Australia. Their debut album, Day One, gained them domestic success, reaching number three on the AIR Independent Album charts and spending a total of 36 consecutive weeks in the top ten.

In 2008, the band released Universes, which made it to number three on the Australian ARIA Albums Chart. 2010 saw the band's self-titled third studio release Birds of Tokyo spend over eight months on the Australian top 20, peaking at number two on the ARIA Albums Chart. The double platinum album received the 2010 ARIA Award for Best Rock Album and in early 2011 the band's breakthrough hit "Plans" ranked number four on Triple J's Hottest 100. The album's follow-up single, "Wild at Heart", reached number one on the country's national airplay chart and won the band an APRA Award.

In 2013, the band released their fourth studio album March Fires. Supported by the album's first two singles "This Fire" and "Lanterns", March Fires debuted at number one on the ARIA Albums Chart—the band's first number-one record. The album was certified gold within four weeks of release and the triple platinum single "Lanterns" was the most played song on Australian radio for the first six months of 2013.

The band released their fifth studio album Brace in November 2016. Their sixth studio album, Human Design, was released in April 2020. It topped the Australian charts upon its release.

History

2004–2005: Early years
Birds of Tokyo formed in 2004 from a collaboration between members of another Perth act Tragic Delicate and Karnivool, from which Ian Kenny came.

The band formed when guitarist Adam Spark asked Kenny to sing on some demos intended to be sold for publication rights. The results were so good, they decided to form a band and release the songs themselves. They took their name from an article one member had read about the absence of birds in Tokyo's high-density central business district due to pollution and overcrowding. "We thought that was interesting, no birds in Tokyo – we thought, we'll be the birds of Tokyo", he says.

In January 2005, Birds of Tokyo released their debut EP, Birds of Tokyo. In October 2005, Birds of Tokyo released a double A side single "One Way/Stay". It was recorded in Melbourne with acclaimed producer Forrester Savell (Helmet, Full Scale, Karnivool).

2006–2007: Day One
2006 saw the band touring regional Western Australia on a three-week tour in January, before returning to Melbourne to finish working on their debut album, Day One. The album was released on 3 February 2007 and debuted at No. 88 on the ARIA Albums Chart and No. 3 on the AIR albums chart.

Directly following the release, the band embarked on extensive touring, starting with their "Day One" tour, playing in five capital cities around Australia. Birds of Tokyo also performed at the Perth leg of the 2007 Big Day Out and the at Blackjack 2007 (the relocated Rock-It festival).

Birds of Tokyo were nominated for two awards in the 2007 AIR Awards (Australian Independent Record Association) for Best Performing Independent Album and Most Outstanding New Independent Artist. "Wayside" was voted in at No. 61 in Triple J's Hottest 100 of 2007.

They were also recognized in Rolling Stone magazine as 'Artists to Watch' in 2007.

2008–2009: Universes
The band recorded their second album Universes in Margaret River, Western Australia, which was mixed in Los Angeles by Tim Palmer (Pearl Jam, Porcupine Tree). The debut single from the album, "Silhouettic", was released as a free download on 14 April 2008. The album was released 5 July 2008 and debuted at No. 3 on the ARIA Albums Chart and at No. 1 on the AIR albums chart. The album reached gold status in Australia in January 2009.

The band played all Australian shows at the Big Day Out in 2009. "Broken Bones", "Silhouettic" and "Wild Eyed Boy" were voted in at No. 20, No. 22 and No. 51 respectively in the Hottest 100 of 2008.

In late 2009, the band embarked on the Broken Strings tour, which featured acoustic interpretations of a selection of their work to date, accompanied by a string quartet and grand piano arranged by producer Anthony Cormican. The supporting artist was Glenn Richards (lead singer of Augie March). A CD and DVD featuring recordings from the tour was available to preorder at the shows, and was released in early 2010 as The Broken Strings Tour. Birds of Tokyo were nominated for the 2009 Channel V Oz Artist of the Year.

2010–2011: Birds of Tokyo
In early 2010, the band returned to the studio to work on their eponymous third album. In March 2010 the band released the single "The Saddest Thing I Know" and announced an Australian tour by the same name. They toured with the New Zealand-based band Midnight Youth. The second single "Plans" was premiered on Sunday 20 June. The album was released on 23 July 2010. They toured with Silversun Pickups in September and October 2010. Birds of Tokyo received six 2010 ARIA Music Awards nominations. "Wild at Heart" was the album's third single. "Plans" was voted at No. 4 in the Hottest 100 of 2010, while "Wild at Heart" and "The Saddest Thing I Know" also appeared at No. 47 and No. 87, respectively. The band also played at the Big Day Out in 2011 for their third time.

In March 2011, the band announced via their Facebook page that bass player Anthony Jackson was leaving the band. Ian Berney from Sugar Army later filled the position.

In April 2011, they played alongside Art vs Science, The Jezabels and local Joshy Willo at the Triple J One Night Stand at Tumby Bay, South Australia.

The band were nominated in five different categories at the 2011 West Australian Music Industry Awards (WAMi), including Most Popular Act, Most Popular Album, Best Male Vocalist, Best Instrumentalist and Best Bassist. The band won for Most Popular Album and Best Instrumentalist.

In late April/early May 2011, Birds of Tokyo played at the annual Groovin' the Moo music festival alongside other Australian artists like Gotye, Washington, Art vs Science and Architecture in Helsinki.

The band toured through September and October 2011, their final national tour for the year. The tour was called the Closer Tour due to the fact that they opted to play smaller venues than they had played prior.

During an interview on Radar, Adam revealed that the band would be heading back into the studio to record their new album over the summer.

2012–2014: March Fires
On 1 February 2012, the band announced that they had finished writing their new album and would start recording the week after. Creating the new album was a journey of "exploration and reinvention" for Birds of Tokyo, telling the story of burning down the old and coming together to build something new. In October 2012, the band released an EP titled This Fire, which featured two songs ("This Fire" and "Boy") from the album. On 14 January 2013, "Lanterns" was released as a single, with its video coming out on 8 February. After being available for preorder on iTunes for 3 months, March Fires was released on 1 March 2013.

Led by the first two singles, March Fires debuted at No. 1 on the ARIA Albums Chart, making it the band's first No. 1 record. The album was certified gold within four weeks of release and the triple platinum single "Lanterns" was the most played song on Australia radio in the first six months of 2013. "When the Night Falls Quiet" was later released as a single, with its video coming out on 22 April.

Birds of Tokyo completed a sell-out tour of Australia to accompany the release and received positive reviews for shows across their March Fires album tour. They also performed at the 2013 AFL Grand Final, Splendour in the Grass 2013 and were announced as the sole support for Muse on their national Australian tour across November and December.

2015–2017: Playlist and Brace
On 24 April 2015, the group released their third EP, Anchor. The EP was supported by a national tour and the release of a single of the same name. The music video for that song was released the following month. Birds of Tokyo subsequently debuted a new song, "I'd Go with You Anywhere", confirming the release of a compilation album, Playlist, which was released in November 2015 and peaked at number 4. The group released their fifth studio album Brace in November 2016. The album peaked at number 3 on the ARIA charts.

2018–2020: Human Design
In September 2018, Birds of Tokyo released "Unbreakable". The song was chosen as the theme for the 2018 Invictus Games in Sydney. Birds of Tokyo performed the track at the official Closing Ceremony on 27 October at Sydney Super Dome. In February 2019, Birds of Tokyo released "Good Lord" which peaked at number 19 on the ARIA charts. This was followed by the singles "The Greatest Mistakes" and "Two of Us".

In February 2020, AFL team West Coast Eagles revealed a revamped official club song, which was produced by bass player Ian Berney and sung by vocalist Ian Kenny.

In February 2020, the band announced the forthcoming release of their sixth studio album, Human Design, released in April 2020. The album debuted at number 1 on the ARIA charts, becoming the band's second chart topper.

2021-present: "Superglue" and "Smith Street"
On 17 September 2021 the band released "Superglue" with Stand Atlantic. The song is described as the "first taste of a new batch of tunes" the band have spent the past year working on.

For the second time, Birds of Tokyo performed at the AFL Grand Final. At the 2021 Grand Final half-time show, they played "Lanterns", a cover of Silverchair's "Straight Lines", and the song "Unbreakable".

On 18 March 2022, the bands released "Smith Street", which was written in the depths of the 2021 Victorian and NSW COVID-19 lockdowns and is an ode to the iconic street in Melbourne's north of the same name.

On 18 November 2022, the band released "Daylight".

Members
Current members
 Ian Kenny – vocals (2004–present)
 Adam Spark – guitars, keyboards, vocals (2004–present)
 Adam Weston – drums, percussion (2004–present)
 Ian Berney – bass (2011–present)
 Glenn Sarangapany – keyboards, synthesisers, vocals (2011–present)

Past members
 Miki Cee – guitars, vocals (2004–2008)
 Anthony Jackson – bass (2004–2011)

Discography

Day One (2007)
Universes (2008)
Birds of Tokyo (2010)
March Fires (2013)
Brace (2016)
Human Design (2020)

Awards and nominations

AIR Awards
The Australian Independent Record Awards (commonly known informally as AIR Awards) is an annual awards night to recognise, promote and celebrate the success of Australia's Independent Music sector.

|-
| rowspan="2" | 2007
|themselves
| Most Outstanding New Independent Artist
| 
|-
| Day One
| Best Performing Independent Album
| 
|-
| rowspan="2" | 2008
| themselves
| Best Independent  Artist
| 
|-
| Universes
| Best Independent Hard Rock/Punk Album
| 
|-
| 2010
|themselves  
| Most Popular Independent Artist
| 
|-

APRA Awards

The APRA Awards are presented annually from 1982 by the Australasian Performing Right Association (APRA), "honouring composers and songwriters".

|-
|rowspan="4"| 2011 || rowspan="4"|"Plans" (Anthony Jackson, Ian Kenny, Adam Spark, Adam Weston) || Breakthrough Songwriter of the Year || 
|-
| Most Played Australian Work || 
|-
| Rock Work of the Year || 
|-
| Song of the Year || 
|-
|rowspan="2"| 2012 || rowspan="2"|"Wild at Heart" (Anthony Jackson, Ian Kenny, Adam Spark, Adam Weston) || Rock Work of the Year || 
|-
| Most Played Australian Work || 
|-
|rowspan="2"| 2013 || rowspan="2"| "This Fire" (Ian Berney, Ian Kenny, Glen Sarangapany, Adam Spark, Adam Westonn) || Rock Work of the Year || 
|-
| Song of the Year || 
|-
| rowspan="4" | 2014 || rowspan="3" | "Lanterns" (Ian Berney, Ian Kenny, Glenn Sarangapany, Adam Spark, Adam Weston) || Most Played Australian Work || 
|-
| Rock Work of the Year || 
|-
| Song of the Year || 
|-
| "When the Night Falls Quiet" (Ian Berney, Ian Kenny, Glen Sarangapany, Adam Spark, Adam Weston) || Rock Work of the Year || 
|-
|rowspan="2"| 2016 || rowspan="2"|"Anchor" (Ian Berney, Ian Kenny, Glen Sarangapany, Adam Spark, Adam Weston) || Rock Work of the Year || 
|-
| Song of the Year || 
|-
| 2017 || "I'd Go with You Anywhere" (Berney, Kenny, Sarangapany, Spark, Weston) || Rock Work of the Year || 
|-
| 2018 || "Brace" (Berney, Kenny, Sarangapany, Spark, Weston) || Rock Work of the Year || 
|-
|rowspan="3"| 2020 ||rowspan="3"| "Good Lord" (Berney, Kenny, Sarangapany, Spark, Adam Weston) || Most Performed Australian Work of the Year || 
|-
||Most Performed Alternative Work of the Year || 
|-
||Song of the Year || 
|-
|rowspan="2"| 2021 ||rowspan="2"| "Two of Us" (Berney, Kenny, Sarangapany, Spark, Weston) || Most Performed Alternative Work || 
|-
| Song of the Year
| 
|-

ARIA Music Awards
The ARIA Music Awards is an annual awards ceremony that recognises excellence, innovation, and achievement across all genres of Australian music. 

|-
|rowspan="6"|2010
|rowspan="2"|Birds of Tokyo
|Best Rock Album
|
|-
|Album of the Year
|
|-
|"Plans"
|Single of the Year
|
|-
| The Broken Strings Tour DVD
| Best Music DVD
|
|-
| Birds Of Tokyo  
| Most Popular Australian Artist
|
|-
| Birds Of Tokyo
| Best Group
|
|-
|rowspan="6"|2011
|rowspan="2"|"Wild At Heart"
| Best Group
| 
|-
| Single of the Year 
| 
|-
| "Plans"
| Highest Selling Single 
| 
|-
| Birds Of Tokyo
| Highest Selling Album 
| 
|-
| Birds Of Tokyo
| Most Popular Australian Live Act
| 
|-
| Birds Of Tokyo 
| Most Popular Australian Artist
| 
|-
|rowspan="6"|2013
|rowspan="3"|March Fires
| Album of the Year 
| 
|-
| Best Group 
| 
|-
| Best Rock Album
| 
|-
|rowspan="2"|"Lanterns"
| Song of the Year 
| 
|-
| Best Video
| 
|-
| March Fires Tour
| Best Australian Live Act 
| 
|-
|rowspan="2"|2019
|rowspan="2"|"Good Lord"
|Best Group
|
|-
|Song of the Year
|
|-

J Awards
The J Awards are an annual series of Australian music awards that were established by the Australian Broadcasting Corporation's youth-focused radio station Triple J. They commenced in 2005.

|-
| J Awards of 2008
| Universes
| Best Album
| 
|-

West Australian Music Industry Awards
The West Australian Music Industry Awards (WAMIs) are annual awards presented to the local contemporary music industry, put on annually by the Western Australian Music Industry Association Inc (WAM).
 
 (wins only)
|-
|rowspan="2"| 2007
| Birds of Tokyo
| Favourite Newcomer
| 
|-
| Ian Kenny (Birds of Tokyo)
| Best Male Vocalist
| 
|-
|rowspan="2"| 2008
| Day One
| Most Popular Album
| 
|-
| Birds of Tokyo
| Best Rock Act
| 
|-
|rowspan="5"| 2009
| Universes
| Most Popular Album
| 
|-
|rowspan="3"| Birds of Tokyo
| Most Popular Act 
| 
|-
| Best Popular Live Act
| 
|-
| Best Rock Act
| 
|-
| Ian Kenny (Birds of Tokyo)
| Best Male Vocalist
| 
|-
|rowspan="2"| 2010
| Birds of Tokyo
| Most Popular Act 
| 
|-
| Ian Kenny (Birds of Tokyo)
| Best Male Vocalist
| 
|-
|rowspan="2"| 2011
| Birds of Tokyo
| Most Popular Album
| 
|-
| Glen Sarangapany (Birds of Tokyo)
| Best Instrumentalist
| 
|-
| 2013
| Ian Kenny (Birds of Tokyo)
| Male Vocalist of the Year 
| 
|-

References

External links 

 Birds of Tokyo website

2004 establishments in Australia
APRA Award winners
ARIA Award winners
Australian indie rock groups
Musical groups established in 2004
Musical groups from Perth, Western Australia
Musical quintets